The Nike HyperAdapt 1.0 is the first self-lacing shoe made directly available for retail. The design of the footwear was executed by Tinker Hatfield accompanied by  Mark Parker, who was heavily involved in the development. Utilizing an electro adaptive lacing system abbreviated as "E.A.R.L.", the sneaker technically autonomously conforms to the figuration of one's foot. On December 1, 2016, they were officially released in limited quantity for $720. However, due to the shoes being released in limited quantity at the time, they are now valued upwards of $200,000. The Hyperadapt has been released several times since the initial release date in extremely small quantities.

References

Footwear